This article details the fixtures and results of the Guam national football team.

Fixtures and results

1975–1999

2000–2009

2010–present

References

Results
National association football team results